Nicarete is a genus of longhorn beetles of the subfamily Lamiinae.

Species
The genus contains the following subgenera and species:

Subgenus Aspurgus
 Nicarete cineraria Fairmaire, 1900

Subgenus Crossotiades
 Nicarete pallidula Fairmaire, 1902
 Nicarete perrieri Fairmaire, 1898

Subgenus Nicarete
 Nicarete albovittipennis Breuning, 1957
 Nicarete brunnipennis Thomson, 1864
 Nicarete holorufa Breuning, 1970
 Nicarete similis Breuning, 1965

Subgenus Ouphalacra
 Nicarete affinis Breuning, 1940
 Nicarete albostictipennis Breuning, 1957
 Nicarete coquereli Fairmaire, 1896
 Nicarete impressipennis Fairmaire, 1897
 Nicarete submaculosa Fairmaire, 1904

Subgenus Tanylamia
 Nicarete albolineata Fairmaire, 1904
 Nicarete melanura Pascoe, 1886
 Nicarete villosicornis (Fairmaire, 1896)

References

Desmiphorini